Tom Kinder was an Australian lawn bowls international who competed in the 1938 British Empire Games.

Bowls career
He bowled for the Hamilton Bowls Club, New South Wales.

At the 1938 British Empire Games he won the bronze medal in the rinks (fours) event with Aub Murray, Charlie McNeill and Harold Murray.

He was the 1938 Australian National Bowls Championships rinks (fours) winner when bowling with the McNeill and the Murrays.

The fours team were known as the Big Four in Australia because they also won four state titles.

References

Australian male bowls players
Bowls players at the 1938 British Empire Games
Commonwealth Games bronze medallists for Australia
Commonwealth Games medallists in lawn bowls
Medallists at the 1938 British Empire Games